Anthene rufoplagata, the orange-patch ciliate blue, is a butterfly in the family Lycaenidae. It is found in Sierra Leone, Liberia, Ivory Coast, Ghana, Togo, Nigeria (east and the Cross River loop), Cameroon, Gabon, the Republic of the Congo, the Central African Republic, the Democratic Republic of the Congo (Kinshasa) and Uganda. The habitat consists of primary forests.

Adult males mud-puddle.

References

Butterflies described in 1910
Anthene